The Corps of INSEE (Corps de l'INSEE) is a technical Grand corps de l'Etat with the National Institute of Statistics and Economic Studies (INSEE).

Service
Its members are public servants known as Administrateurs de l'INSEE. Most of them work for INSEE or in the French  Ministry of the Economy.

Education
People entering the Corps are educated at the École nationale de la statistique et de l'administration économique−ENSAE. Most of them are from the École polytechnique and are known as X-INSEE. The rest come from the École Normale Supérieure, the regular curriculum of the ENSAE (École nationale de la statistique et de l'administration économique), ENSAI or internal promotion.

References

 
Institut national de la statistique et des études économiques
INSEE
Demographics of France
National statistical services